Cross Lake is the name of two closely related, adjoining but independent communities in the Canadian province of Manitoba. One of the Cross Lakes is the Cross Lake Indian Reserve (Pimicikamak Cree) of the Cross Lake First Nation where the main urban area is called Cross Lake. The other Cross Lake is on nearby provincial Crown land. The communities are located about 520 kilometres by air north of Winnipeg, and 120 kilometres by air south of Thompson. They are situated on the shores of the Nelson River where the river enters Cross Lake. An all-weather road, PR 374, connects the communities to PR 373 via the Kichi Sipi Bridge.

In March 2016, Cross Lake appeared in the national news after First Nation officials declared a state of emergency because of an epidemic of
suicides. The Canadian Press reported that there had been "six suicides in the last two months and 140 attempts in the last two weeks alone",
and band councillor Donnie McKay said the community "is traumatized and needs immediate help from the provincial and federal governments".

Demographics 

The adjoining reserves of Cross Lake 19 (population 1,751 in 2011), Cross Lake 19A (population 1,889 in 2011) and Cross Lake 19E (population 682 in 2011) of the Cross Lake First Nation had a combined population of 7,622 in 2011.

Together these communities formed a population centre of 9,033 in 2017.

Notable people
Brady Keeper, professional hockey player

Geography 
The communities are situated on the eastern shores of Cross Island and Cross Lake. The lake is on the Nelson River north of Lake Winnipeg. It is long and narrow and extends 102 km (63 mi) east-northeast. The Nelson enters and leaves on the west side. The Minago River enters on the west. From the Minago a portage trail leads to Moose Lake and the Saskatchewan River. On the east side via the Walker River, Walker Lake and Kapaspwaypanik Lake the Kapaspwaypanik Portage leads to the Carrot River and Oxford Lake on the Hayes River.

Climate 
Cross Lake has a subarctic climate (Koppen: Dfc), typical of Northern Manitoba. Temperatures in the summer are warm, whilst in the winter they are bitterly cold.

References 

Designated places in Manitoba
Hudson's Bay Company trading posts
Localities in Manitoba
Northern communities in Manitoba
Unincorporated communities in Northern Region, Manitoba